Prays curulis is a moth in the  family Plutellidae. It is found in Nepal and northern India.

External links
 Prays curulis at www.catalogueoflife.org.

Plutellidae
Moths described in 1914